The Alexandra Stakes is a Moonee Valley Racing Club Group 3 Australian Thoroughbred horse race for three year old fillies, at set weights with penalties, over a distance of 1600 metres, held at Moonee Valley Racecourse in Melbourne, Australia late March.  Prize money is A$200,000.

History
The race was originally held in October on W. S. Cox Plate day, but was moved to the autumn in 2013 and is now on the William Reid Stakes race day in March.

Name
 1987–1993 - Crown Lager Stakes
 1994–1999 - Great Western Stakes
 2000 - Salinger Trophy
 2001 - Rosemount Estate Trophy
 2002–2004 - Eliza Park Stakes 
 2005–2006 - Moormoot Stud Stakes
 2007–2010 - Arrow Training Services Stakes
 2011 - Jeep Stakes
 2013 onwards - Alexandra Stakes

Grade
1983–2015 - Listed Race
2016 onwards - Group 3

Winners

 2022 - Daisies
 2021 - Chica Fuerte
2020 - Paradee
2019 - Princess Jenni
2018 -  Think Bleue
2017 - Oregon's Day
2016 - Thames Court
2015 - Fontein Ruby
2014 - Marianne
2013 - You're So Good
2012 - †race not held
2011 - Torah
2010 - Zubbaya
2009 - Sublimity
2008 - Bauble
2007 - Miss Marielle
2006 - Manna Miss
2005 - Brockman's Lass
2004 - Creative Plan
2003 - Ike's Dream
2002 - Dextrous
2001 - Omens
2000 - Donna Dior
1999 - Miss Pennymoney
1998 - Rose O' War
1997 - Melinte
1996 - ‡Simply Believe / Suria
1995 - Vigil
1994 - Ladybird Blue
1993 - Super Snooper
1992 - Flitter
1991 - Dancefloor Doll
1990 - Mammy
1989 - Aretha
1988 - Memphis Blues
1987 - Sandy's Pleasure
1986 - Glowing Idol
1985 - Torvill
1984 - Delightful Belle
1983 - Sentimental Lady

† Change in race calendar when the MVRC moved the race to autumn

‡ Dead heat

See also
 List of Australian Group races
 Group races

References

Horse races in Australia